Deh-e Hajji Abbas Khan (also Romanized as Deh-e Ḩājjī ‘Abbās Khān; also known as Deh-e Ḩājj ‘Abbās Khān) is a village in Dust Mohammad Rural District, in the Central District of Hirmand County, Sistan and Baluchestan Province, Iran. At the 2006 census, its population was 439, in 85 families.

References 

Populated places in Hirmand County